Tarmo Manni  (30 July 1921, in Saarijärvi – 24 September 1999, in Helsinki) was a Finnish actor. He worked for the Finnish National Theatre 41 years of his 44-year career and appeared in 65 films between 1944 and 2000. Manni was known as a flamboyant persona, on and off stage. However, in his final theatre performance, he just sat in a chair for an hour, listening to Gustav Mahler's First Symphony.

Selected filmography

Dynamiittityttö (1944)
Ihmiset suviyössä (1948)
Prinsessa Ruusunen (1949)
Gabriel, Come Back (1951)
Omena putoaa (1952)
April's Coming (1953)
Kun on tunteet (1954)
The Unknown Soldier (1955)
Punainen viiva (1959)
Koko kaupungin Vinski (1969)
Da Capo (1985)
Jäähyväiset presidentille (1987)

References

External links 
 

Finnish male film actors
1921 births
1999 deaths
People from Saarijärvi
20th-century Finnish male actors